is a Japanese sprinter. He competed in the 4 × 400 m relay event at the 2012 Summer Olympics.

References

External links
 

Japanese male sprinters
1991 births
Living people
Olympic athletes of Japan
Athletes (track and field) at the 2012 Summer Olympics
Kansai University alumni
People from Takamatsu, Kagawa
21st-century Japanese people